Wutul is a rural locality in the Toowoomba Region, Queensland, Australia. In the  Wutul had a population of 37 people.

Geography 
The New England Highway passes through the locality from the south-east to the north-east, intersecting with the Oakey–Cooyar Road (State Route 68).

History 
Wutul takes its name from the Wutul railway station, which was named on 28 April 1913. It is reported to be an Aboriginal word indicating good grass.

The Cooyar railway line opened to Wutul on 28 April 1913 with the locality served by the Wutul railway station.

Wutul State School opened on 14 September 1914 and closed on 1961.

In the  Wutul had a population of 37 people.

References 

Toowoomba Region
Localities in Queensland